After Marriage is a 1925 American silent drama film directed by Norman Dawn and starring Margaret Livingston, George Fisher, and Helen Lynch.

Plot
As described in a film magazine review, David Morgan, a young man who tires of his wife Lucille, is captivated by the actress Alma Lathrop, only to learn that his one rival for her full attention is his own father. Father and son meet on the actress’ yacht. The son leaves and, in a quarrel, the woman kills his father. She is arrested. The young man asks his wife’s forgiveness, and it is granted.

Cast

References

Bibliography

External links

1925 drama films
1920s English-language films
American silent feature films
Silent American drama films
Films directed by Norman Dawn
American black-and-white films
1920s American films